Raphael or Raphain (died after 1217) was a Hungarian distinguished nobleman, who served as voivode of Transylvania in 1217, during the reign of Andrew II of Hungary. He might have been also in office in 1218.

According to László Markó, he was originated from the gens Szalók. Before his voivodeship, Raphael served as ispán (comes) of Küküllő County in 1214.

References

Sources
 Engel, Pál (2001). The Realm of St Stephen: A History of Medieval Hungary, 895-1526. I.B. Tauris Publishers. .
  Markó, László (2006). A magyar állam főméltóságai Szent Istvántól napjainkig – Életrajzi Lexikon ("The High Officers of the Hungarian State from Saint Stephen to the Present Days – A Biographical Encyclopedia") (2nd edition); Helikon Kiadó Kft., Budapest; .
 Treptow, Kurt W. & Popa, Marcel (1996). Historical Dictionary of Romania. Scarecrow Press, Inc. .
  Zsoldos, Attila (2011). Magyarország világi archontológiája, 1000–1301 ("Secular Archontology of Hungary, 1000–1301"). História, MTA Történettudományi Intézete. Budapest. 

Voivodes of Transylvania
Medieval Transylvanian people
13th-century Hungarian people